Hans-Georg Schierholz (16 August 1921 – 12 February 1996) was a Bordfunker (radio/radar operator) and Oberfeldwebel in the Luftwaffe night fighter force during World War II. He was awarded the Knight's Cross of the Iron Cross.

He flew on 212 combat missions, assisted in 57 aerial victories, and bailed out four times. He served in the crews of Oberfeldwebel Rudolf Frank and Major Werner Husemann.

Awards and decorations 
 Fliegerschützenabzeichen
 Front Flying Clasp of the Luftwaffe in Gold
 in Bronze (13 August 1941)
 in Silver (6 July 1942)
 in Gold (28 August 1943)
 Iron Cross (1939)
 2nd Class (4 July 1941)
 1st Class (1 May 1942)
 German Cross in Gold on 20 March 1944 as Unteroffizier in the 6./Nachtjagdgeschwader 3
 Ehrenpokal der Luftwaffe on 17 April 1944 as Unteroffizier and radio operator
 Knight's Cross of the Iron Cross on 29 October 1944 as Oberfeldwebel and Bordfunker (radio/wireless operator) in the I./Nachtjagdgeschwader 3

References

Citations

Bibliography

External links 
 

1921 births
1996 deaths
People from Bentheim
Luftwaffe personnel of World War II
Recipients of the Gold German Cross
Recipients of the Knight's Cross of the Iron Cross
Military personnel from Lower Saxony